The 2004 Men's World Floorball Championships C-Division took place over April 21 to 25, 2004 in Leganés, Spain.

The 2004 Men's World Floorball Championships were the first men's floorball championships that required a C-Division. Up until 2004, all teams played in just two divisions.

A Georgian team was scheduled to take part in the tournament, but withdrew due to problems obtaining visas from Spanish authorities.

Championship results

Preliminary round

Group A

Group B

Placement round

5th Place match

Playoffs

Semi-finals

Bronze Medal match

Gold Medal match

Standings
Official 2004 Rankings according to the IFF

See also
2004 Men's World Floorball Championships
2004 Men's World Floorball Championships B-Division

External links
Standings & Statistics

|-style="text-align: center; background: #ffa07a;"
|align="center" colspan="3"|Men's World Floorball Championships C-Division

2004, C-Division
Mens World Floorball Championships C-division, 2004
2004 in Spanish sport
International sports competitions hosted by Spain